The 70th anniversary of the founding of the People's Republic of China was observed with a series of ceremonial events including a grand military parade as its spotlight to celebrate National Day of the People's Republic of China that took place on 1 October 2019 in Beijing. It was the largest military parade and mass pageant in Chinese history.

Chinese Communist Party (CCP) general secretary Xi Jinping, who was the guest of honour, gave the holiday address to the nation and Chinese expatriates before inspecting the formations along Chang'an Avenue. Premier Li Keqiang was the master of ceremonies and General Yi Xiaoguang was the chief commander of the parade.

Background 

The CCP had defeated the Kuomintang Party following the Chinese Civil War, which occurred intermittently between 1927 and 1950 In the aftermath of the civil war, the Kuomintang and its loyalists then retreated to the island of Taiwan, formerly a prefecture of the Qing Empire, which had been under Japanese colonial rule from 1895 to 1945.

The founding of the People's Republic of China was formally proclaimed by Mao Zedong, the Chairman of the Chinese Communist Party, on 1 October 1949 at 3:00 pm in Tiananmen Square in Peking (formerly Peiping), the new capital (Nanking had been the capital of the former Republic of China). The first public parade of the then new People's Liberation Army took place there, following the chairman's address of the formal foundation of the new republic. Before this, as the national anthem March of the Volunteers was played, the new national flag of the People's Republic of China was officially unveiled to the newly founded nation and hoisted for the first time during the celebrations as a 21-gun salute fired in the distance.

In its early years, the People's Republic of China was not internationally recognized as the Republic of China held its seat in the United Nations and the Security Council as the sole legitimate government of "China" by the United States and western nations. In 1971, the PRC was admitted to the United Nations and thus excluded the ROC from United Nations membership.

Since the establishment of the PRC, celebrations of varying scales occur on National Day each year. Military parades, presided over by chairman Mao Zedong, were held every year between 1949 and 1959, the first decade of the PRC. In September 1960, the Chinese leadership decided that to save funds and "be frugal", large-scale ceremonies for National Day would only be held every ten years, with a smaller-scale ceremony every five years.(The tradition of the yearly parade, though, would be partially revived with parades held in 1969 and 1970.) Since China's opening and reform, the most prominent National Day celebrations have taken place in 1984, 1999, and 2009 at the 35th, 50th and 60th anniversaries respectively.

The 70th national anniversary parade was the fifth major parade since Xi Jinping took power as CCP General Secretary (China's paramount leader) and Chairman of the Central Military Commission (Commander-in-chief) in 2012, and occurred with the mass protests in Hong Kong that have been on-going since 9 June as backdrop.

Preparations 

The official logo for the 70th anniversary of the founding of the People's Republic of China was officially unveiled by the State Council Information Office on 3 June 2019. Many celebrations throughout China and overseas Chinese communities were planned for the year of 2019. In early September, rehearsals took place in central Beijing for the military parade. General Cai Zhijun of the Joint General Staff said in a press briefing that it would not be targeted "at any countries or districts" but rather would be "committed to safeguarding world peace and regional stability". It was expected to be bigger than the parades commemorating the 50th and 60th anniversary of the PRC, as well as the 2015 China Victory Day Parade.

The capital was covered with red flags, adorning apartment compounds and neighbourhoods; banners reading "Today's China is the result of the work of Chinese people" were draped across overpasses, and topiaries were installed around the roads in Beijing. The authorities gave out 620,000 television sets allowing those not invited to still be able to watch the festivities.

Although a massive National Day fireworks display had been planned along the harbour in Hong Kong to celebrate the 70th anniversary – as it has done every year since 1997, Hong Kong government cancelled them "for safety reasons" over the protests in the city that have lasted since March. A more low-key celebration was planned in the territory.

Security 
The city of Beijing was in virtual lockdown in the run-up to the anniversary. Objects that could overfly the capital – for example kites, balloons, drones and even pigeons – were banned. The use of walkie-talkies and other devices using radio waves, as well as alcohol, also joined the list of things that were disallowed.

Weeks before the anniversary, motorists were prohibited from refuelling their cars or motorcycles on their own. During rehearsals for a military parade to mark the day, residents close to Tiananmen Square received instructions to stay away from windows and to keep their curtains drawn. Guests in hotels in the vicinity of Tiananmen Square were told that for several hours each day, they would not be able to leave or return to it for hours at a time. Shops and restaurants in the centre closed or shortened their opening hours; some metro stations were closed temporarily.

Hong Kong 

Hong Kong protesters marked a "national day of mourning". In defiance of a police ban on the annual march that the Civil Human Rights Front (CHRF) applied for, four veteran democrats led a rally from Causeway Bay to Central, mourning the victims of CCP rule and calling for the end of one-party rule in mainland China. Simultaneously, protesters held rallies in Wong Tai Sin, Tuen Mun, Tsuen Wan, Sha Tin and Sham Shui Po, which drew tens of thousands of participants. The protests were initially peaceful, but violent incidents occurred later during the day. MTR stations and businesses that were thought to be associated with the mainland were vandalised. Multiple warning shots were fired in various popular districts;  in Tsuen Wan, a police officer fired a live round at an 18-year-old male secondary school student at point blank range with a revolver. It was the first live round fired at a person by the Hong Kong police in this series of protests. The protester was rushed to hospital in a critical condition.

Media 

China Media Group (CMG), the state-owned holding firm of the China Central Television (CCTV) network and the China Global Television Network (CGTN) international channels, was expected to mainly broadcast synchronously for domestic and foreign TV channels with CCTV-1 as the producing channel for the celebrations, while national, provincial and city broadcasters and TV stations, domestic internet video, portals, and live webcast sites also broadcast the event simultaneously via the CCTV-1 feed. CGTN broadcast the events live overseas and online, including on YouTube, in multiple languages. In addition, China National Radio and China Radio International, both also owned by CMG, served as the official radio stations broadcasting the festivities. On 4 September 2019, CMG held a mobilization meeting to celebrate the 70th anniversary. More than 260 representatives from its member companies attended the event. As the focus of the celebration, the company's radio and television units were bound to take publicity reporting of the celebrations seriously. The China TV News published on 19 September announced on the front page that the second issue (published on the 26th) would disclose the relevant live broadcast arrangements of China Media Group to the event.

Various overseas media also paid attention to the coverage of this event, and those who already met the conditions could broadcast it worldwide. The "press centre for the celebration of the 70th anniversary of the founding of the People's Republic of China" was based in Beijing's Media Center and was officially launched on 23 September.

A "special clean-up operation" was initiated targeting "harmful political information" and any Sina Weibo accounts or posts that "distort the history of the party and the country".

Musical concert 
To mark the special anniversary of national foundation, on Sunday, 29 September, the celebrations began with the CCTV-produced musical concert gala The Nation Moves Onward aired nationwide on CCTV-1 live from the Great Auditorium of the Beijing Great Hall of the People, in which Central Military Commission (CMC) chairman and general secretary of the CCP Xi Jinping attended as guest of honour together with other party and national leaders, veterans of the PLA and other invited guests.

Wreath-laying ceremony 
The 15th annual wreath laying ceremony in honour of the heroes and martyrs of the Chinese nation and people was held in earnest on 30 September, National Memorial Day, on the grounds of Tiananmen Square  which CMC Chairman and General Secretary of the CCP Xi Jinping attended as guest of honour, together with other party and national leaders, veterans of the PLA, distinguished citizens, the Young Pioneers and representatives of the civil service and the private sector, in which flowers and wreaths were laid in the Monument to the People's Heroes. 

In an earlier ceremony at the Great Hall of the People, 42 individuals, including several foreigners, were awarded by paramount leader Xi as part of the National Day honours list (several of the awards were posthumous) with national orders and decorations for merit and service to the republic and people as well as to contributing to enhanced ties with foreign countries.

Civil-military parade

Leaders in attendance
Xi Jinping (General Secretary, President and CMC chairman)
Jiang Zemin (former General Secretary of the CCP, 1989–2002)
Hu Jintao (former General Secretary of the CCP, 2002–2012)
Li Keqiang (Premier, official master of ceremonies for the parade)
Li Zhanshu (Congress chairman)
Wang Yang (Conference chairman)
Wang Huning (First Secretary of the Secretariat)
Zhao Leji (Secretary of Discipline Inspection)
Han Zheng (First Vice Premier)
Wang Qishan (Vice President)
Li Ruihuan (former Conference chairman, 1993–2003)
Wu Bangguo (former Congress chairman, 2003–2013)
Wen Jiabao (former Premier, 2003–2013)
Jia Qinglin (former Conference chairman, 2003–2013)
Song Ping (former State councillor of the State Council, 1983–1988)
Other Politburo Standing Committee members and Politburo members

Military parade

Infantry formation 
In order of appearance:
People's Liberation Army Guard of Honour
PLA Leaders/Commanders Formation (a combined battalion of commissioned officers from the CMC, various PLA and PAP branches)
PLA Ground Force Formation represented by the 82nd Group Army
PLA Navy Formation
PLA Air Force Formation represented by the Airborne Corps
PLA Rocket Force Formation
PLA Strategic Support Force Formation
Joint Logistics Support Force Formation
People's Armed Police Formation
Female Soldiers Formation represented by the Army Medical University
Institute Researchers Formation (a combined cadet battalion of PLA educational, research and development institutions) represented by officer cadets from the Academy of Military Science, National Defence University and National University of Defense Technology
Civilian Staff Formation (a combined battalion of civilian personnel in the CMC and PLA)
PLA Reserve Service Forces Formation
Female Militia Formation (from the Chaoyang District, nicknamed the "Iron Roses")
Chinese Peacekeeping Forces Formation represented by the 81st Group Army

Vehicle column
In order of appearance:
 War Flag Formation, represented by CSK-181 "Warrior" off-road vehicles bearing battle colours from 100 heroic companies from each service branch of the PLA
 Ground Warfare Module
 Tank Formation: Type 99A main battle tank
 Light Armor Formation: Type 15 light tank, Type 04A infantry fighting vehicle
 Amphibious Assault Vehicle Formation: Type 05A amphibious assault vehicle
 Airborne Combat Vehicle Formation: Type 03 airborne infantry fighting vehicle
 Self-Propelled Artillery Formation: PCL-181 truck-mounted 155mm gun-howitzer, PHL-16 long-range multiple rocket launcher
 Anti-Tank Missile Formation: HJ-10 anti-tank missile vehicle
 Special Operations Equipment Formation: CS/VP4 "Lynx" all-terrain vehicle, "Hunting Eagle" assault autogyro
 Armed Police Counterterrorism Assault Formation: "Warrior" counter-terrorism assault vehicle, WJ-03B anti-riot armored vehicle
 Naval Warfare Module
 Coast-to-Ship Missile Formation: YJ-12B anti-ship missile
 Ship/Submarine-to-Ship Missile Formation: YJ-18A anti-ship missile, YJ-18B submarine-launched anti-ship missile
 Shipborne Air Defense Weapon Formation: HHQ-9B long-range anti-air missile, HQ-16 medium-range anti-air missile, HQ-10 short-range anti-air missile, H/PJ-11 CWIS
 Air Defense/Anti-Missile Module
 Early-Warning Radar Formation
 1st Surface-to-Air Missile Formation: HQ-9B long-range anti-air missile, HQ-22 long-range anti-air missile
 2nd Surface-to-Air Missile Formation: HQ-12A medium-range anti-air missile, HQ-6 short-range anti-air missile
 Field Air Defense Missile Formation: HQ-17A short-range anti-air missile, HQ-16B medium-range anti-air missile
 Information Warfare Module
 1st Information Warfare Formation
 2nd Information Warfare Formation
 3rd Information Warfare Formation
 4th Information Warfare Formation
 Unmanned Warfare Module
 1st Drone Warfare Formation: WZ-8 high-altitude hypersonic stealth UAV
 2nd Drone Warfare Formation: "Wing Loong-2" HALE UCAV, "Sharp Sword" stealth UAV
 3rd Drone Warfare Formation: HSU-001 unmanned underwater vehicle
 Logistics & Equipment Support Module
 Supply & Provision Formation: Field vehicles for water purification, platform-laying, refueling and food processing
 Repair & Rescue Formation: Field vehicles for combat surgery, equipment recovery, disassembly and repair and search and rescue
 Strategic Strike Module
 DF-17 Conventional Missile Formation
 CJ-100 Cruise Missile Formation
 DF-26 Nuclear/Conventional Missile Formation
 JL-2 Missile Formation
 DF-31AG Nuclear Missile Formation
 DF-5B Nuclear Missile Formation
 DF-41 Nuclear Missile Formation

Flypast column 
 Command Echelon
 One KJ-2000 AEWC aircraft, eight J-10A fighters from the August 1st Aerobatics Team with colored smoke
 Early Warning & Control Echelon in three formations:
 One KJ-500 AEWC aircraft, four J-16 strike fighters
 One KJ-200 AEWC aircraft, four J-16 strike fighters
 One Y-8 C&C aircraft, four J-16 strike fighters
 Maritime Patrol Echelon in two formations:
 One KJ-500H AEWC aircraft, two Y-8G ASW patrol aircraft
 One KJ-500H AEWC aircraft, two Y-8G reconnaissance aircraft
 Transporter Echelon in two formations:
 Three Y-20 strategic airlifters
 Three Y-9 tactical airlifters
 Support & Security Echelon in two formations:
 One Y-9 electronic-warfare aircraft, one Y-9 psychological warfare aircraft, one Y-9 aeromedical aircraft
 One Y-8 long-range support jammer aircraft, one Y-8 electronic-warfare aircraft, one Y-8 electronic reconnaissance aircraft
 Bomber Echelon in three formations:
 Three H-6N long-range strategic bombers
 Three H-6K bombers
 Three H-6K bombers
 Refueller Echelon
 One HY-6 tanker aircraft, two J-10B air superiority fighters
 Carrier-Based Aircraft Echelon
 Five J-15 carrier-based multirole fighters
 Fighter Echelon in three formations:
 Five J-20 stealth fighters
 Five J-16 strike fighters
 Five J-10C multirole fighters
 Army Aviation Assault Echelon in five formations:
 Reconnaissance & Alert Module: five Z-9 armed reconnaissance helicopters
 Firepower Assault Module: nine WZ-10 attack helicopters
 Troop Assault Module: three WZ-19 reconnaissance/attack helicopters, six Z-20 general utility helicopters
 Landing Assault Module: nine Z-8B transport helicopters
 Escort Module: eight WZ-19 attack helicopters
 Trainer Echelon in four formations:
 Five JL-10 trainers
 Five JL-9 trainers
 Five JL-8 trainers
 Seven JL-8 trainers with colored smoke

Civilian parade 
In order of appearance:

 Flag of the People's Republic of China
 National Emblem of the People's Republic of China preceded by the years 1949 and 2019
 Red flag bearers
 Open-top buses carrying family members and relatives of the founding fathers of the PRC, members of the Central People's Government and deputies of the CPPCC, as well as veterans of the People's Liberation Army and living participants of the 1949 parade, escorted by motocycle riders of People's Armed Police

Music 
The Central Military Band of the People's Liberation Army of China is composed of 1,321 musicians. The head and chief commander is Zhang Haifeng. For the first time, the military orchestra used military instruments such as military numbers, long ceremonies, and timpani drums during the National Day military parade. In this military parade, a total of 28 pieces of music were played, such as "March of the Steel Torrent", "Chongshang Yunxiao", "Honor to the Horn", "Divided Horn", etc. 12 of which are classic marches and 16 are new pieces. On National Day, there were a total of 50 rehearsals for the parade and mass parade, including 25 military parades and masses. The mass parade will also join the 2,100 adult choirs, 400 children's choirs from the Central Radio and Television Station Galaxy Junior Television Art Troupe and the 130 National Percussion Orchestra, claiming to be the world's largest "square concert".

Military parade 
 Inspection
 Welcome March
 March of the Volunteers (National Anthem of the People's Republic of China)
 The Horn and Overture
  Military Parade
 The People's Army is Loyal to the Party
 Military Anthem of the People's Liberation Army
 Troops Review March of the PLA (Inspection March of the PLA)
 Three Rules of Discipline and Eight Points for Attention
 The New Army Goes Forward
 People's Navy, Forward
 March of the PLA Air Force
 March of the People's Liberation Army Rocket Force
 Song of the Loyal Guards
 Battle Hymn of the Strong Army
 Please Review

 Marching
 Divisional Horn
 Parade March of the People's Liberation Army
 Steel Torrent March
 Blue Journey March
 Eagle Strike March
 Thousand-Mile Decisive Victory March
 Sweeping East Wind March
 Rushing into the Clouds
 Glorious Moments
 Victory is Upon Us

Civilian parade 
 Ode to the Red Flag
 Ode to the Motherland
 Without the Communist Party, There Would Be No New China
 The East is Red
 Socialism is Good

National Day evening gala
A 90-minute grand evening gala was slated to be held at the Tiananmen Square at 8:00 p.m. 60,000 people attended the evening gala, including a total of at least 6,940 performers at the grounds of the square. CMC Chairman and General Secretary Xi Jinping was the guest of honour of the gala night, together with other party and national leaders present.

Republic of China (Taiwan) denunciation 

In the Republic of China (ROC), the governing pro-independence party Democratic Progressive Party (DPP) denounced the PRC and CCP as threats to peace and trying to find excuses for its military expansion and rejects the "One country, two systems" model.  DPP leader and ROC president Tsai Ing-wen told reporters that "We are a country of democracy and freedom and will show support for anyone in the world who pursues democracy and freedom. Likewise, any ruler should carefully listen to the people's pursuit of freedom and democracy and respect the people's will."

Some members of the pro-unification opposition party Kuomintang (KMT) called on the DPP to accept the 1992 Consensus while rejecting the Taiwan independence movement.

See also 

 National Day of the People's Republic of China
Golden Week (China)
10th anniversary of the People's Republic of China
60th anniversary of the People's Republic of China
1987 October Revolution Parade

Notes

References

External links 
 

2019 in military history
2010s in Beijing
2019 in China
Anniversaries
Events in Beijing
Military history of the People's Republic of China
Military parades in China
October 2019 events in China
Selected anniversaries (2019)